Clifton is a hamlet in Northumberland, in England. The population is between 20 and 30. It is situated a short distance to the south of Morpeth, on the A1. It forms a trio with Hepscott and Glororum, a series of farms founded by the Brown brothers at the end of the 19th century. However, Clifton as a habitation stretches back earlier. In the 12th century lands were held at Clifton, under Roger de Merlay, by William of Clifton. There was a coaching inn here dating from the 17th century.

Governance 
Clifton is in the parliamentary constituency of Hexham. It is part of Stannington Civil Parish.

References

External links

Hamlets in Northumberland